Sălătrucel is a commune located in Vâlcea County, Muntenia, Romania. It is composed of four villages: Pătești, Sălătrucel, Seaca and Șerbănești.

References

Communes in Vâlcea County
Localities in Muntenia